(born , 13 February 1964) is a Japanese vocalist and visual artist, best known as a member of Boredoms and Naked City. He has changed his stage name three times, from Yamatsuka Eye, to Yamantaka Eye, to Yamataka Eye, and sometimes calls himself eYe or EYヨ. He also DJs under the name DJ 光光光 or "DJ pica pica pica" ("pica" means "bright" or "shiny"), and has used numerous other pseudonyms.

Music

Boredoms 
Born in Kobe, Eye is a founder of the influential rock music band, Boredoms, whose first major label release came out in the early '90s.  They were signed to Warner Bros. (Chocolate Synthesizer era) by David Katznelson, then A&R VP of Warner Bros.  The closest thing Boredoms have to a frontman, Eye offers a variety of vocal techniques: gurgles, screams, grunts and occasionally, relatively conventional singing. In the later days of Boredoms and in today's V∞redoms he plays electronics and open reel tapes.

Other 
Yamantaka Eye is also a member of the bands Hanatarash, UFO or Die, Puzzle Punks, Noise Ramones and Destroy 2. He is notorious for his vast, confusing discography and countless guest appearances. In 1993, he recorded  an EP with Sonic Youth called TV Shit for Thurston Moore's label, Ecstatic Peace. He also collaborated with Yamamoto Seiichi & Yamazaki Maso in the project "(Triple) Yama's" which was titled for their shared namesake. He released two albums, Live! and Live!!, with Japanese turntablist/improviser Otomo Yoshihide, under the moniker "MC Hellshit & DJ Carhouse". He formed a music and art group called Puzzle Punks, with Shinro Ohtake.

Other notable collaborations include his work with Bill Laswell's Praxis and with John Zorn's groups  Naked City and Painkiller. Eye and Zorn also recorded the album Zohar as the "Mystic Fugu Orchestra." This latter compilation, which both commemorates and satirizes Jewish culture, also draws strength from Eye's earlier influence from the Oomoto religion in Japan, a sect claiming to possess visions of an emerging world order. Several generations of Eye's family belonged to Oomoto, which was at times brutally suppressed by the Japanese government. Yamantaka participated in the Boredoms 77 Boadrum performance which occurred on July 7, 2007 at 7:07 PM at the Empire-Fulton Ferry State Park in Brooklyn, New York, and the 88 Boadrum performance which occurred on August 8, 2008 at 8:08 PM at the La Brea Tar Pits in Los Angeles, California.

Art 
As well as his music, Eye is famous for his mixed-media style of art that utilises airbrush, marker pen and collage, amongst other materials. This work has adorned a number of records, including the majority of Boredoms releases. Similar to the Boredoms' musical direction, Eye started incorporating a much more psychedelic, calmer approach into his work, evident on the covers of many of the later Boredoms albums. Drawing as much from Japanese mythology as it does from his musical influence, such as early punk imagery, his work aims to complement the music as well as to provide another dimension to the sound. Eye also drew a comic strip in 1991, titled Frogleg Burning-X Comix Death. 

Eye worked on the covers of the Beck albums Sexx Laws, Midnite Vultures, and Stray Blues - A Collection of B-Sides.

When discussing Eye's unique art style, Stylus Magazine writer Mike Powell commented:

Eye has presented his work at MoMA/PS1 in New York, in the Music is a Better Noise, and the Volume: Bed of Sound exhibitions.

Discography

Audio Sports 
 3-6-9 (Bron Records) (EP) (1991)
 Eat+Buy+Eat (All Access) (EP/CD) (1992)
 Era of Glittering Gas (All Access) (CD) (1992)

Boredoms 

 Osorezan no Stooges Kyo (1988)
 Soul Discharge (1989)
 Pop Tatari (1992)
 Chocolate Synthesizer (1994)
 Super æ (1998)
 Vision Creation Newsun (1999)
 Seadrum/House of Sun (2005)

Destroy 2 
 We Are Voice and Rhythm Only (1996)

DJ Chaos X 
 Live Mixxx (2006)

DJ Pica Pica Pica 
 Planetary Natural Love Gas Webbin' 199999 (1999)

Hanatarashi 
 Hanazumari (1984)
 Take Back Your Penis!! (1984)
 Live Axtion 84.4.20 & 1.29 (1984)
 Noisexa (1984)
 Bombraining (1984)
 The Hit Parade 1 (1984)
 The Hit Parade 2 (1984)
 Hane Go Go (1984)
 Man Of Noise Noise Kyojin (1984)
 Live! 1984 3.24 (1984)
 8448-412 (1984)
 Live Action 84.1.29 (1984)
 Live Act 16.Dec.1984 at Zabo Kyoto (1984)
 Merzbow & Hanatarashi (1985) (with Merzbow)
 Worst Selektion (1985)
 Worst Selektion (1985)
 Hanatarashi 1 (1985)
 Hanatarashi 2 (1987)

Hanatarash 
 3: William Bennet Has No Dick (1990)
 The Hanatarash and His Eye (1992)
 Live!! 1984 Dec. 16: Zabo-Kyoto (1993)
 Total Retardation (1995)
 4: Aids-a-delic (1995)
 5: We are 0:00 (1996)

The Lift Boys
 Anarchy Village b/w Anarchy Way (2005)
 Lift Boyz (2005)
 Tide Y Edit (2012)
 Jukey Lift (2014)

MC Hellshit & DJ Carhouse
 Live!
 Live!!

Puzzle Punks
 Pipeline - 24 Smash Hits by 24 Puzzle Punk Bands (1996)
 Budub (1996)
 Puzzoo (2006)

Tribal Circus
 Tribal Circus (2000) (with Hifana)

Yamataka Eye
 Re...Remix? (2008) (remix compilation)

 Sky Size Sea (2010)

Noise Ramones
 Rocket To DNA (1999)

with Battles
 Gloss Drop (2011)

with John Zorn
 Nani Nani (1995)
 Zohar (as Mystic Fugu Orchestra) (1995)
 Naninani II (2004)
 50th Birthday Celebration Volume 10 (2005)

with Naked City
 Naked City (1989)
 Torture Garden (1990)
 Grand Guignol (1992)
 Heretic (1992)
 Leng Tch'e (1992)
 Radio (1993)

with Praxis
 Sacrifist (1994)

with Sonic Youth
 TV Shit (1994)

with Ween
 Z-Rock Hawaii (1997)

See also
 Japanese art
 Dadaism

References

External links
 Lambiek Comiclopedia biography.

Avant-garde singers
Japanese male rock singers
Japanese heavy metal singers
Noise rock musicians
1964 births
Living people
Musicians from Kobe
Naked City (band) members
Painkiller (band) members
Boredoms members
Japanese graphic designers
Japanese illustrators
Manga artists
Album-cover and concert-poster artists